The 1994 San Diego State Aztecs football team represented San Diego State University during the 1994 NCAA Division I-A football season as a member of the Western Athletic Conference (WAC).

The team was led by head coach Ted Tollner, in his first year. They played home games at Jack Murphy Stadium in San Diego. They completed the season with a record of four wins, seven losses (4–7, 2–6 WAC).

Schedule

Team players in the NFL
The following were selected in the 1995 NFL Draft.

The following finished their college career in 1994, were not drafted, but played in the NFL.

Team awards

Notes

References

San Diego State
San Diego State Aztecs football seasons
San Diego State Aztecs football